"Warum werde ich nicht satt?" (roughly Why am I not satisfied?) is a song by Die Toten Hosen. It's the fourth single and the third track from the album Unsterblich.

It's narrated by a wealthy man, who nevertheless isn't happy with what he's got and contemplates, why he's not fed up yet with all of it.

Music video
The music video was directed by Wim Wenders.

Campino plays a rich, successful man, who lives in a futuristic house with a sexy woman (Michaela Schaffrath). During the chorus he is seen in a normal middle-class home. Later in the song he begins to decrease in size, whereas the persona in the middle-class apartment starts to grow.

Track listing
 "Warum werde ich nicht satt?" (Breitkopf, von Holst/Frege) − 3:28
 "Babylon's Burning" (Jennings, Ruffy, Owen, Fox) − 4:25 (The Ruts cover)
 "Should I Stay or Should I Go" (Mick Jones/Joe Strummer) − 2:43 (The Clash cover)

Charts

2000 singles
Die Toten Hosen songs
Songs written by Campino (singer)
Songs written by Andreas von Holst
Songs written by Michael Breitkopf
1999 songs